Vivica Genaux (born July 10, 1969) is an American coloratura mezzo-soprano. She was born in Fairbanks, Alaska. She has sung in major operas such as The Barber of Seville at the Metropolitan Opera, L'italiana in Algeri at Opéra National de Paris, and La Cenerentola with Dallas Opera and the Bavarian State Opera.

Education and singing career
Vivica Genaux was born on July 10, 1969, in Fairbanks. Her father was a biochemistry professor at the University of Alaska Fairbanks and her Mexico-born mother was a language teacher. She began her vocal studies as a young girl with American dramatic soprano Dorothy Dow. Ms. Genaux then studied with the late Nicola Rossi-Lemeni and Virginia Zeani at Indiana University Bloomington and for many years with Claudia Pinza Bozzolla (daughter of bass Ezio Pinza) in Pittsburgh. She began her professional career specializing in charming portrayals of Rossini comic heroines (Rosina in Il barbiere di Siviglia, Isabella in L'italiana in Algeri, Angelina in La Cenerentola). She has performed these roles more than two hundred times with many of the major U.S. opera companies (including the Metropolitan, San Francisco, Dallas, Seattle, San Diego, Pittsburgh, and Minnesota Operas), as well as in Paris, Vienna, Berlin, Amsterdam, Dresden, Munich, Montreal, Tel Aviv, Verona, Santiago and Perth.

Her official debut took place in Florence in October 1994 as Isabella in L'italiana in Algeri.

Her role as the hero in Handel's Arminio was her first baroque role, and she continues to expand her repertoire, which currently includes 28 roles, 20 of which are pants roles (a woman—often a mezzo-soprano—playing a male character), and some of which were originally written for the castrato voice.

Highlights
Prior career highlights have included: Brussels (La Monnaie) and Paris (Champs-Elysées) for Hasse's Marc'Antonio e Cleopatra, led by long-time mentor, conductor René Jacobs; the recently rediscovered Alessandro Scarlatti oratorio La Santissima Trinità in Paris, Palermo and Lyon, which marked her first collaboration with Fabio Biondi and his Europa Galante; Gluck's Orfeo ed Euridice at the Los Angeles Opera; a Weill Hall recital at New York's Carnegie Hall; Rosinas at the Deutsche Staatsoper Berlin, Vienna State Opera and the Metropolitan Opera; the Opéra National de Paris (Barbiere and Alcina); a concert at the Deutsche Staatsoper Berlin with René Jacobs and the Akademie für Alte Musik performing music from their "Arias for Farinelli" CD; Mendelssohn's A Midsummer Night’s Dream in Paris and Hong Kong with Kurt Masur and the Orchestre National de France; Rinaldo in Montpellier and Innsbruck; Minnesota Opera for Lucrezia Borgia, I Capuleti e i Montecchi and Semiramide; Urbain in Les Huguenots for the opening of the new opera house in Bilbao; Hassem in Donizetti's Alahor in Granata in Seville; Selimo in Hasse's Solimano at the Deutsche Staatsoper Berlin; Juno/Ino in Handel's Semele at New York City Opera; and seven appearances at the Caramoor Festival.

Recordings

L'Atenaide (Teodosio) – Vivaldi
 with Modo Antiquo & Federico Sardelli, conductor
 NAÏVE OP30438 3 CD
 U.S. Release August 22, 2007

Handel & Hasse Arias & Cantatas (solo)
 with Les Violins du Roy, Bernard Labadie, Conductor
 VIRGIN CLASSICS (1 CD) 7243 5 45737 2 9
 U.S. Release September 2006

Bajazet (Irene) – Vivaldi
 Grammy Nominated
 with Europa Galante, Fabio Biondi, Conductor
 VIRGIN VERITAS 45676-2
 U.S. Release May 2005

La Santissima Trinità (Teologia) – Scarlatti
 with Europa Galante, Fabio Biondi, Conductor
 VIRGIN VERITAS 5456662 (1 CD)
 Released May 2004

Bel Canto Arias (solo) – Donizetti/Rossini
 with Ensemble Orchestral de Paris, John Nelson, Conductor
 VIRGIN CLASSICS 7243 5 45615 2 8
 Released September 2003

Rinaldo (Title Role) – Handel
 René Jacobs, Conductor
 HARMONIA MUNDI HMC 901796.98
 Released May 2003

Arias for Farinelli (solo) – Various Artists
 Grammy Nominated
 with Akademie für Alte Musik, René Jacobs, Conductor
 HARMONIA MUNDI HMC 901778
 Released 2002

Arminio (Title Role) – Handel
 with Il Complesso Barocco, Alan Curtis, Conductor
 VIRGIN Veritas 5 45461 2
 Released August 2001

An Evening of Arias and Songs (solo) – Various Artists
 EPCASO 93515 04012
 Released June 1999

Alahor in Granata - Donizetti
 with Orquestra Ciudad de Granada, Josep Pons, Conductor
 Almaviva  ASIN B00003Z9UQ
 Released Dec 2006

Personal life
Vivica is a distant relative of Belgian football player Régis Genaux. Her interest in European Baroque music led her to settle in Venice. She is the subject of 2004 documentary A Voice Out of the Cold.

References

External links
 Official website
 Fanfare Webzine The Original Vivica Genaux site
 Extensive interview with Vivica Genaux on Opera Lively

1969 births
Living people
American operatic mezzo-sopranos
American musicians of Mexican descent
American people of Walloon descent
Handel Prize winners
Hispanic and Latino American musicians
Indiana University Bloomington alumni
Singers from Alaska
People from Fairbanks, Alaska
American performers of early music
Women performers of early music
20th-century American women opera singers
21st-century American women opera singers
Hispanic and Latino American women singers